Sempronius may refer to:

 Sempronius, the nomen of the Roman gens Sempronia
 Sempronius, a character in the play The Apple Cart
 Sempronius, New York
 Sempronius, Texas
 Sempronius Stretton, a British Army officer and artist
 Sempronius H. Boyd, U.S. Congressman from Missouri and U.S. Civil War Colonel.
 Sempronius, a fictional Roman senator in Cato, a Tragedy by Joseph Addison